The Washington–Baltimore combined statistical area is a statistical area including two overlapping metropolitan areas, Washington, D.C. and Baltimore, Maryland. The region includes Central Maryland, Northern Virginia, three counties in the Eastern Panhandle of West Virginia, and one county in South Central Pennsylvania. It is the most educated, highest-income, and third-largest combined statistical area in the United States behind New York–Newark and Los Angeles–Long Beach.

The area is designated by the Office of Management and Budget (OMB) as the Washington–Baltimore–Arlington, DC–MD–VA–WV–PA Combined Statistical Area. It is composed primarily of two major Metropolitan statistical areas (MSAs): the Washington–Arlington–Alexandria, DC–VA–MD–WV MSA and the Baltimore–Columbia–Towson, Maryland Metropolitan Statistical Area. In addition, five other smaller urban areas not contiguous to the main urban area but having strong commuting ties with the main area are included in the metropolitan area. These are: the Hagerstown–Martinsburg, Maryland–West Virginia MSA, the Chambersburg–Waynesboro, Pennsylvania MSA, the Winchester, VA–WV MSA, the California–Lexington Park, Maryland MSA, and the Easton, Maryland micropolitan statistical area (µSA).

Some counties, such as Caroline and King George County, Virginia, are not officially designated by OMB as members of this metropolitan area, but still consider themselves members anyway. This is mostly due to their proximity to the area, the size of their commuter population, and by the influence of local broadcasting stations. The population of the entire Washington–Baltimore Combined Statistical Area as of the 2020 census was 9,973,383. The area's most-populous city is Washington, D.C. with a population of 689,545, and the area's most populous county is Fairfax County, Virginia, with a population of 1,150,309.

Components of the combined statistical area 
The counties and independent cities and their groupings that comprise the area are listed below with their 2012 population estimates. Central counties/cities (designated as such by OMB) for each MSA are shown in italics.
 Washington–Arlington–Alexandria, DC–VA–MD–WV Metropolitan Area (5,860,342)
 Silver Spring–Frederick–Rockville, MD Metropolitan Division (1,244,291)
 Frederick County, Maryland
 Montgomery County, Maryland
 Washington–Arlington–Alexandria, DC–VA–MD–WV Metropolitan Division (4,616,051)
 Washington, District of Columbia
 Calvert County, Maryland
 Charles County, Maryland
 Prince George's County, Maryland
 Arlington County, Virginia
 Clarke County, Virginia
 Culpeper County, Virginia
 Fairfax County, Virginia
 Fauquier County, Virginia
 Loudoun County, Virginia
 Prince William County, Virginia
 Woodbridge, Virginia
 Rappahannock County, Virginia
 Spotsylvania County, Virginia
 Stafford County, Virginia
 Warren County, Virginia
 Alexandria, Virginia
 Fairfax, Virginia
 Falls Church, Virginia
 Fredericksburg, Virginia
 Manassas, Virginia
 Manassas Park, Virginia
 Jefferson County, West Virginia
 Baltimore–Columbia–Towson, MD Metropolitan Area (2,753,149)
 Baltimore City
 Anne Arundel County
 Baltimore County
 Carroll County
 Harford County
 Howard County
 Queen Anne's County
 Hagerstown–Martinsburg, MD–WV Metropolitan Area (256,278)
 Washington County, Maryland
 Berkeley County, West Virginia
 Chambersburg–Waynesboro, PA Metropolitan Area (151,275)
 Franklin County, Pennsylvania
 Winchester, VA–WV Metropolitan Area (130,907)
 Frederick County, Virginia
 Winchester city, Virginia
 Hampshire County, West Virginia
 California–Lexington Park, MD Metropolitan Area (108,987)
 St. Mary's County
 Easton, MD Micropolitan Area (38,098)
 Talbot County, Maryland

Regional organizations

Metropolitan Washington Council of Governments 
Founded in 1957, the Metropolitan Washington Council of Governments (MWCOG) is a regional organization of 23 Washington-area local governments, as well as area members of the Maryland and Virginia state legislatures, the U.S. Senate, and the U.S. House of Representatives. MWCOG provides a forum for discussion and the development of regional responses to issues regarding the environment, transportation, public safety, homeland security, affordable housing, community planning, and economic development.

The National Capital Region Transportation Planning Board, a component of MWCOG, is the federally designated Metropolitan Planning Organization for the metropolitan Washington area.

Baltimore Metropolitan Council 
The Baltimore Metropolitan Council is the equivalent organization for the Baltimore portion of the combined Baltimore–Washington metropolitan area. The BMC, which was created in 1992 as the successor to the Regional Planning Council and Baltimore Regional Council of Governments, consists of the Baltimore region's elected executives, representing Baltimore City and Anne Arundel, Baltimore, Carroll, Harford and Howard counties.

The Baltimore Regional Transportation Board is the federally recognized Metropolitan Planning Organization for transportation planning in the Baltimore region.

List of principal cities

Baltimore area
 Baltimore, Maryland
 Aberdeen, Maryland
 Annapolis, Maryland
 Arbutus, Maryland
 Bel Air, Maryland
 Brooklyn, Maryland
 Brooklyn Park, Maryland
 Catonsville, Maryland
 Cockeysville, Maryland
 Columbia, Maryland
 Curtis Bay, Maryland
 Dundalk, Maryland
 Eldersburg, Maryland
 Elkridge, Maryland
 Ellicott City, Maryland
 Essex, Maryland
 Fullerton, Maryland
 Glen Burnie, Maryland
 Halethorpe, Maryland
 Linthicum, Maryland
 Lutherville-Timonium, Maryland
 Middle River, Maryland
North Laurel, Maryland
 Owings Mills, Maryland
 Overlea, Maryland
 Parkville, Maryland
 Pasadena, Maryland
 Perry Hall, Maryland
 Pikesville, Maryland
 Randallstown, Maryland
 Reisterstown, Maryland
Savage, Maryland
 Severna Park, Maryland
 Towson, Maryland
 Westminster, Maryland
 Woodlawn, Maryland

Washington area

 Washington, District of Columbia
 Bethesda, Maryland
 Bowie, Maryland
 Chevy Chase, Maryland
 College Park, Maryland
 Frederick, Maryland
 Gaithersburg, Maryland
 Germantown, Maryland
 Laurel, Maryland
 Potomac, Maryland
 Rockville, Maryland
 Silver Spring, Maryland
 Upper Marlboro, Maryland
 Alexandria, Virginia
 Annandale, Virginia
 Arlington, Virginia
 Ashburn, Virginia
 Chantilly, Virginia
 Fairfax, Virginia
 Falls Church, Virginia
 Fredericksburg, Virginia
 Great Falls, Virginia
 Herndon, Virginia
 Langley, Virginia
 Leesburg, Virginia
 Manassas, Virginia
 Manassas Park, Virginia
 Massaponax, Virginia
 McLean, Virginia
 Mt. Vernon, Virginia
 Reston, Virginia
 Springfield, Virginia
 Tysons, Virginia
 Vienna, Virginia
 Charles Town, West Virginia
 Martinsburg, West Virginia

Economy

Primary industries

Biotechnology 
Not limited to its proximity to the National Institutes of Health in Bethesda, Maryland's Washington suburbs are a major center for biotechnology. Prominent local biotechnology companies include MedImmune, United Therapeutics, The Institute for Genomic Research, Human Genome Sciences and the Howard Hughes Medical Institute.

Defense contracting 
Many defense contractors are based in Northern Virginia and Montgomery County, Maryland to be close to the Pentagon in Arlington. Local defense contractors include Lockheed Martin, the largest, as well as Northrop Grumman, General Dynamics, BAE Systems Inc., Computer Sciences Corporation (CSC), Booz Allen Hamilton, Leidos, Science Applications International Corporation (SAIC), and Orbital Sciences Corporation.

Notable company headquarters in the region 
Numbers denote Fortune 500 ranking.

Maryland 
Baltimore area:
 Advertising.com (Baltimore)
 Allegis Group (Hanover)
 Black & Decker (Towson)
 Ciena Corporation (Hanover)
 Colfax Corporation (Annapolis Junction)
 Constellation Energy (Baltimore) 
 Corporate Office Properties Trust (Columbia)
 The Cordish Companies (Baltimore)
 CoverGirl (Hunt Valley)
 Fila USA (Sparks)
 Firaxis Games (Sparks)
 Legg Mason (Baltimore)
 McCormick & Company (Hunt Valley) 482
 MICROS Systems (Columbia)
 Millennial Media (Baltimore)
 Nielsen Audio (Columbia)
 Pandora Jewelry USA (Baltimore)
 T. Rowe Price (Baltimore) 447
 Transamerica Corporation (Baltimore)
 Sinclair Broadcast Group (Hunt Valley) 465
 Sourcefire (Columbia)
 Sylvan Learning (Baltimore)
 Under Armour (Baltimore)
 W.R. Grace & Co. (Columbia)
 The Whiting-Turner Contracting Co. (Towson)

Washington area:
 2U (company) (Lanham, Maryland)
 ASRC Aerospace Corporation (Greenbelt, Maryland)
 Bethesda Softworks (Rockville)
 Clark Construction (Bethesda)
 Choice Hotels (Rockville)
 Coventry Health Care (Bethesda)
 EagleBank (Bethesda)
 Enviva (Bethesda)
 Federal Realty Investment Trust (Rockville)
 GEICO (Chevy Chase)
 Host Hotels & Resorts (Bethesda) 472
 Hughes Network Systems (Germantown)
 Inovalon (Bowie, Maryland)
 JBG Smith (Chevy Chase)
 Lockheed Martin (Bethesda) 49
 Marriott International (Bethesda) 293
 MedImmune (Gaithersburg)
 New Enterprise Associates (Chevy Chase)
 Novavax (Gaithersburg)
 Radio One (Lanham)
 Ritz-Carlton (Chevy Chase)
 Travel Channel (Chevy Chase)
 TV One (Silver Spring)
 United Therapeutics (Silver Spring)

Washington, D.C. 
 &pizza
 APCO Worldwide
 Atlantic Media
 Black Entertainment Television
 Blackboard Inc.
 Bluemercury
 Carlyle Group
 Chemonics
 Cogent Communications
 CoStar Group
 Danaher Corporation 239
 Fannie Mae 53
 FiscalNote
 Framebridge
 Gallup
 Mapbox
 Morning Consult
 National Geographic Society
 NGP VAN
 Pepco Holdings 279
 Social Tables
 The Advisory Board Company
 The Washington Post Company
 Vox Media
 XM Satellite Radio

Northern Virginia 

 AES Corporation (Arlington) 194
  Amazon (Crystal City)
 Appian Corporation (Tysons Corner)
 AvalonBay Communities (Arlington)
 Airbus North America (Herndon)
 BAE Systems Inc. (Arlington)
 Bechtel (Reston)
 Bloomberg Industry Group (Arlington)
 Boeing Defense, Space & Security (Arlington)
 Booz Allen Hamilton (McLean) 481
 CACI (Arlington)
 Capital One (McLean) 100
 Carfax (Centreville, Virginia)
 Computer Sciences Corporation (Falls Church) 379
 Communications Satellite Corporation (Herndon)
 Comscore (Reston)
 Cvent (Tysons Corner) 
 DynCorp International (Falls Church)
 Freddie Mac (McLean) 39
 FNH USA (Fredericksburg)
 FLIR Systems Government and Defense (Arlington) 
 Graham Holdings (Arlington)
 Gannett Company (McLean)
 General Dynamics (Falls Church) 90
 GTT Communications (Tysons Corner)
 Hilton Hotels Corporation (McLean) 241
 ICF International (Fairfax)
 Iridium Communications (McLean)
 Stride, Inc. (Herndon)
 Kellogg Brown and Root Services (Arlington)
 Leidos (Reston) 381
 Ligado Networks (Reston)
 Mars, Incorporated (McLean)
 M.C. Dean, Inc. (Dulles)
 MicroStrategy (Tysons Corner)
 Naviance (Arlington)
 Navy Federal Credit Union (Vienna)
 NII Holdings (Reston)
 Northrop Grumman (Falls Church) 114
 NVR Incorporated (Reston) 446
 Orbital Sciences (Dulles)
 Park Hotels & Resorts (Tysons Corner)
 Parsons Corporation (Centreville)
 Rolls-Royce North America (Reston)
 Rosetta Stone (Arlington)
 Science Applications International Corporation (McLean)
 SLM Corporation (Reston) "Sallie Mae" 
 Strategic Education, Inc. (Herndon)
 Space Adventures (Vienna)
 Tegna Inc. (Tysons Corner)
 The Motley Fool (Alexandria, Virginia)
 The Teaching Company (Chantilly) 
 Verisign (Reston)
 Verizon Business (Ashburn)
 Volkswagen Group of America (Herndon)
 VSE Corporation (Alexandria, Virginia)
 XO Communications (Herndon)

Sports

Table of professional teams and venues

Transportation

Commercial Service Airports

Rail transit systems 
 Amtrak
 Washington Metro
 Virginia Railway Express
 MARC Train
 Baltimore Light Rail
 Metro Subway
 DC Streetcar
 Purple Line (future light rail)

Major highways 
Interstates
  Interstate 66
  Interstate 70
  Interstate 81
  Interstate 83
  Interstate 95
  Interstate 97
  Interstate 195
  Interstate 270
  Interstate 295
  Interstate 370
  Interstate 395 (District of Columbia-Virginia)
  Interstate 395 (Maryland)
  Interstate 495 (Capital Beltway)
  Interstate 595 (Unsigned)
  Interstate 695 (District of Columbia)
  Interstate 695 (Baltimore Beltway)
  Interstate 795
  Interstate 895

U.S. Routes
  U.S. Route 1
  U.S. Route 11
  U.S. Route 15
  U.S. Route 29
  U.S. Route 40
  U.S. Route 50
  U.S. Route 301
  U.S. Route 340

State Routes
  Maryland Route 2
  Maryland Route 4
  Maryland Route 5
  Maryland Route 26
  Maryland Route 32
 Maryland Route 97
  Maryland Route 100
  Maryland Route 200 (Intercounty Connector)
  Baltimore–Washington Parkway (Maryland Route 295)
  Maryland Route 355
  Virginia State Route 3
  Virginia State Route 7
  Virginia State Route 9
  Virginia State Route 28
  Virginia State Route 267
  Virginia State Route 286 (Fairfax County Parkway)
  Virginia State Route 289 (Franconia–Springfield Parkway)
  West Virginia Route 9

See also

 United States metropolitan area
 National Capital Region
 List of parks in the Baltimore–Washington metropolitan area
 Beltway Series

References

 
Baltimore metropolitan area
Washington metropolitan area
Geography of Baltimore
Geography of Washington, D.C.
Northern Virginia
Regions of Maryland
Regions of Virginia
Regions of Pennsylvania
Regions of West Virginia
Northeast megalopolis